Kaokor Galaxy, also written as Khaokor Galaxy (Thai: เขาค้อ แกแล็คซี่, born, May 15, 1959) is a Thai former professional boxer who competed from 1985 to 1989. He held the WBA bantamweight title twice between 1988 and 1989. Khaokor and his twin brother Khaosai Galaxy became the first twins to win a boxing world title.

Personal life
Khaokor Galaxy was born as "Virote Saenkham" (Thai: วิโรจน์ แสนคำ, nicknamed: Rote) and raised in Ban Chaliang Lab, Tambon Na Pha, Mueang Phetchabun, Phetchabun, Thailand. Although he was born after Khaosai, he was still considered by the Thai as the older brother because of their ancient belief regarding twins. 

Khaokor graduated at Phetchabun Technical College same as Khaosai. Khaokor and Khaosai always liked boxing and fighting since they were children. Their parents bought them their first Muay Thai gloves. Their parents eventually took them to meet their first Muay Thai trainers, Prakan Vornsiri and Mana Lhawpradit.

Khaokor was nicknamed as Denja Mueangsritep (Thai: เด่นจ๋า เมืองศรีเทพ) for a Muay Thai competition, which is related to Khaosai's nickname, Dawden Mueangsritep (Thai: ดาวเด่น เมืองศรีเทพ). Both of them competed around Phetchabun and the nearby provinces. Khaokor started joining competitions before Khaosai and would use his twin brother's name. Niwat Lhawsuwanwat (Thai: นิวัฒน์ เหล่าสุวรรณวัฒน์) would take them to Bangkok for a professional training program and later, joined many competitions in Bangkok.

Professional career 
Like his brother, he started his career in kickboxing and would later switch to boxing. After becoming a star in Thailand, he followed a long-standing Thai custom of adopting an attention-getting ringname and thus he became known as Khaokor Galaxy after Khaokor, a renowned natural tourist attraction at his birthplace. 

Khaokor Galaxy made his professional boxing début in 1985, winning his first seven fights before capturing the Thailand bantamweight title in July 1986. In 9 May 1988, he won against Wilfredo Vazquez to take the WBA bantamweight title. With this victory, the Galaxy brothers became the first twins to be world champions. Khaokor would also be the first Thai bantamweight champion.

After Khaokor and Khaosai won their titles, Tam Pai Doo, a variety TV show on Channel 9, organized an exhibition bout that pitted the twins against each other, the contest was produced at Rajadamnern Stadium, Bangkok. Khaosai beat Khaokor by points in three rounds.

Khaokor lost the title three months later in his first defense against Korean Sung-Kil Moon, when an accidental clash of heads caused a sixth-round stoppage with Khaokor behind on points. He bounced back with five straight wins to earn a rematch with Moon on 9 July 1989.  Khaokor won the rematch easily, winning in all 12 rounds on two scorecards and 11 on the third scorecard. Once again though, Khaokor lost the title in his first defence three months later, against Luisito Espinosa. Surprisingly, he retired at that point with a record of 24 wins and 2 losses. The defeat to Espinosa was unexpected, but Khaokor was caught with a left hook, and about 20 seconds later just collapsed out of thin air.

Retirement 
Two months after Khaokor lost his title, the twins had a fan meeting event in Phetchabun. While driving home, they had a car accident which was driven by Khaosai. Khaokor was sent to the ICU for 21 days while, Khaosai only suffered minor injuries and would later be back to professional boxing.

Khaokor decided to retire after his recovery from the car accident but still helped Khaosai in his trainings. When Khaosai decided to retire, Khaokor went back to look after his business full-time, a snooker club.

In his retirement, he got a film job as a main actor for a low-budget Thai movie titled "My name is..Mahingsa" (Thai: ข้าชื่อ..มหิงสา). He was also a boxing trainer for Siriporn Thaweesuk (Thai: ศิริพร ทวีสุข), the first  female Thai professional boxing champion. Khaokor had many businesses such as a snooker club, selling car roof accessories, and a restaurant in Bangkok. He also used to work as a recreation attendant for the Phetchabun Government and also worked in a pawnshop.

He would later be broke after poor financial activities such as spending a lot of money with his ex-girlfriends. Although he got broke, he still got many opportunities in getting jobs and eventually settled in. Currently, Khaokor married Tak Jirapwan (Thai: แต๊ก จีรวรรณ) and have two sons, with four years age difference.

Professional boxing record

References

External links 
 

1959 births
Living people
Bantamweight boxers
World bantamweight boxing champions
World Boxing Association champions
Kaokor Galaxy
Kaokor Galaxy
Kaokor Galaxy
Kaokor Galaxy